Saprosites raoulensis is a species of dung beetle endemic to the Kermadec Islands in New Zealand. The holotype specimen of this species was discovered during a scientific expedition to the Kermadecs by W. L. Wallace in 1908. It was found under rotten logs on Raoul Island.

Taxonomy
New Zealand entomologist Thomas Broun first described this beetle as Aphodius raoulensis in 1910 after receiving the specimen for determination from its collector W. L. Wallace. This type specimen is currently held at the Auckland Museum. The species was placed in the genus Saprosites by Aola M. Richards in 1959 and the holotype specimen was redescribed by Richards as Broun's description differed from the type specimen in several ways.

The specific name is derived from the name of the island the species was collected from, Raoul Island, and -ensis a Latin derived adjective suffix meaning "originated in".

Description

Saprosites raoulensis is 5.5 mm in length and 2.5 mm in width. The beetle is pitch black in colour with the front border of the prothorax being a dull brick red. Its legs are a reddish brown.

Distribution and habitat

This beetle is apparently rare and specimens have only been recorded as being from Raoul Island.

Predation

Broun hypothesized that the significant number of rats on Raoul Island at the time of collection of the type specimen were likely to negatively impact various beetle populations.

References

External links

 Information on Saprosites raoulensis in the New Zealand Organisms Register

Beetles described in 1910
Beetles of New Zealand
Fauna of the Kermadec Islands
Endemic fauna of New Zealand
Raoul Island
Endemic insects of New Zealand